Khao jee pâté, is a Lao baguette-based sandwich, similar to Vietnam's bánh mì. It is a famous street food found throughout Laos. The baguette or French bread was introduced to Laos when Laos was ruled under French Indochina.

The sandwich is made by splitting the baguette lengthways and spread with a thick layer of pork liver pâté, stuffed with pork or Lao sausage, sliced papaya, carrots, shallots or onion, cucumber, cilantro and sometimes Jeow bong or chili sauce.

See also
 List of sandwiches

References

Lao cuisine
Southeast Asian breads
French fusion cuisine
Offal sandwiches